Sonny Corey Uwaezuoke (born March 5, 1991), better known by his stage name Sonny Digital, is an American record producer, rapper, and DJ. He rose to prominence after producing YC's hit single "Racks" in 2011. He is best known for his production on ILoveMakonnen's "I Dont Sell Molly No More" and "Tuesday" featuring Drake, Future's single "Same Damn Time", 50 Cent's "I'm the Man" and 2 Chainz's "Birthday Song", as well as the XXL Freshman Cyphers for 2017 and 2018. He has worked with multiple hip-hop artists, such as Future, Gucci Mane, 2 Chainz, Drake, Chief Keef, 50 Cent, and more.

He is also a frequent collaborator with label-mates such as Shawty Blast, 808 Mafia's Southside and TM88. He is signed as a producer to Universal Publishing.

Early life
Sonny was born on March 5, 1991, in Saginaw, Michigan and quickly moved to Atlanta, Georgia while still an infant. He has been involved in making music since an early age. At first he started rapping while at school, but found it hard to get instrumentals to rap over. When he was 13, he was influenced by his older cousin to start making beats. Aside from school, Sonny didn't have other hobbies like playing sports or video games, so he dedicated a large amount of his free time to creating music. Sonny was inspired by famous producers Shawty Redd and Drumma Boy and initially tried to copy their sound while learning to make beats. Eventually his production transformed into his own style.

Career

2011-2013: First charting singles and success 
When he was 16, he joined a hip-hop group as a producer and was also producing mixtapes for other local artists. In 2011, YC used one of his beats for the single "Racks", which went to become a national hit, peaking at #42 on the Billboard Hot 100 and being certified Gold by RIAA. The song was also featured in the Billboard 2011 Year-end Rap songs and R&B/Hip-hop songs charts.

Sonny released his first official mixtape Digital History on May 9, 2011. The tape, hosted by DJ 1Hunnit, is a collection of songs Sonny had produced between 2010 and 2011. It features many rappers, such as Plies, Wale, 2 Chainz and Future. It has been viewed over 70,000 times on LiveMixtapes.

Sonny produced six songs on Gorilla Zoe's album King Kong released in June. Sonny's second mixtape Behind the Muzik was released on September 8, 2011. It is a collaboration with fellow producer Will A Fool, where each produced half of the songs.

In late 2011, Sonny produced Future's hit single "Same Damn Time", which was initially featured on Future's mixtape Streetz Calling. Following the song's success, in 2012 Future released a new version of "Same Damn Time" as the third official single from his debut album Pluto. It peaked at number 92 on the Billboard Hot 100. A music video for the single was released on April 4, 2012. Sonny Digital also produced the official remix of "Same Damn Time" featuring rappers Diddy and Ludacris, which was released on May 17, 2012. The remix was featured on Future's re-release of Pluto, titled Pluto 3D.

In March 2012, Sonny produced Gorilla Zoe's mixtape Gorilla Zoe World. The tape was certified bronze for being downloaded over 25,000 times on popular mixtape site DatPiff. In early 2012 Sonny also worked on Gucci Mane's mixtapes Trap Back and I'm Up. On June 8, 2012, Sonny Digital released his debut rap single, "Business Man", featuring rapper Que. The song was produced by BWheezy.

Sonny produced 2 Chainz' single "Birthday Song", which was released on July 24, 2012. Sonny created the original beat, which was later modified by a number of GOOD Music producers – Kanye West, BWheezy, Anthony Kilhoffer, Lifted and Mike Dean. The single peaked at number 49 on the US Hot 100, and also entered top 10 of the R&B and Rap charts. The official music video was released on August 30, 2012, and became a viral success, gaining over 30 million views on YouTube.

Later in 2012, Sonny produced the track "Don't Get Me Started", which was featured on the deluxe version of DJ Khaled's album Kiss the Ring, as well as on Ace Hood's mixtape Body Bag 2. The official video for the promo single was released on August 17, 2012 on Ace Hood's YouTube channel. Sonny was featured on Jo FloWroshus' single "Attention" from his 900° album. In an interview with BET Sonny stated he was working with artists B.o.B, Ace Hood and Wiz Khalifa, and making a new mixtape with fellow producer Drumma Boy. He also wants to work with a famous pop singer like Justin Bieber.

In March 2013, Sonny released a collaboration mixtape with rapper Que, titled Forbes Atlanta.

2014-present: Billboard top 10 and more projects 
In 2014, Sonny produced the track "Tuesday" by ILoveMakonnen and Drake. The song peaked at number 12 on the Billboard Hot 100.

In August 2018, Sonny produced the Travis Scott song "Stargazing", which peaked at number eight on the Hot 100 and earned Sonny his highest charting single.

In 2019, Sonny announced a follow-up collaboration project with Black Boe, the album to be titled Black Goat II, after 2017's Black Goat.

Other ventures 
In 2011, Sonny created his own label, Sonny Digital Music Group. Currently, he is the only artist signed to the label.

Artistry 
Sonny uses the music production software FL Studio along with custom plug-ins to make his beats. He seeks inspiration in listening to other producers' tracks, music in general and watching movies.

Discography

Mixtapes
 2011 – Digital History, hosted by DJ 1Hunnit
 2011 – Behind the Muzik (with Will A Fool), hosted by DJ Iceberg & DJ Pretty Boy Tank
 2012 – Gorilla Zoe World (with Gorilla Zoe), hosted by Trap-A-Holics, DJ Smallz & DJ Nando
 2013 – Forbes Atlanta (with Que), hosted by DJ Scream & DJ Spinz
 2016 - MadeInDigital (with MadeinTYO)
 2017 - Black G.O.A.T (with Black Boe)

Singles
 2012 – "Business Man" (feat. Que), prod. by BWheezy
 2018 – "I Got" (feat. Lil Xan & $teven Cannon), prod. by DJFU
 2019 – "Work", prod. by Nebu Kiniza

Production discography

Charted songs

Production credits

2011 
Gorilla Zoe - King Kong
 03 - Crazy (featuring Gucci Mane) (with Jesse "Corporal" Wilson (co))
 04 - Nasty (featuring Yo Gotti)
 05 - At All (featuring Ray Dinero)
 06 - What's Goin On
 08 - Your Bitch
 09 - My Shawty

Wiz Khalifa - Cabin Fever
 08 - WTF (with Lex Luger)

YC - NBA Live 2005 Exclusive
 01 - Racks (featuring Future)

Juicy J - Rubba Band Business 2
 04 - You
 13 - Bought Some Guns Yesterday

Roscoe Dash - J.U.I.C.E.
 06 - Very First Time
 07 - Awesome

Kevin Gates - "Drug Dealer Potential"
 01 - Drug Dealer Potential

Ace Hood - Blood, Sweat & Tears
 06 - Memory Lane (featuring Kevin Cossom)

Wale – The Eleven One Eleven Theory
 09 - Passive Agrees-Her

Juicy J - Blue Dream & Lean
 03 - Juicy J Can't
 08 - Geeked Up On Them Bars
 17 - You Want Deez Rackz (with Lex Luger)
 23 - Been Gettin' Money

Future - Streetz Calling
 02 - Same Damn Time

Yung Joc - Ready To Fly
 02 - Deuces (Feat. Tity Boi)

2 Chainz - UNKNOWN
 00 - 10 Summaz Feat. Rick Ross

Kid Ink – Wheels Up
 06 - Never Change

Ilovemakkonnen side by side

2012 
Jody Breeze - Airplane Mode
 "Hood Shit" (feat. Big Gee)
 "Aliens" (ft. Raven Ramone)
 "Sprint" (feat. Cash Out)

Future – Astronaut Status
 08 - Jordan Diddy (featuring Gucci Mane)

Gorilla Zoe - Gorilla Zoe World
 All songs

Gucci Mane - Trap Back
 02 - Back in 95

SPOT – The Price Iz Right
 02 - Young N!ggaz Gettin $ (featuring Sonny Digital)

Gucci Mane - I'm Up
 09 - Drink Mud

Future - Pluto
 11 - Same Damn Time

Young Lace – Above Average
 05 - Sold Out (featuring Dubb & Cashout Kidd)
 06 - Ball (featuring Cashout Kidd & Mann)
 12 - Money In (featuring Kid Ink)
 14 - How We Ball (Feat. T.I. & Don)

Juicy J – Blue Dream & Lean (Bonus Tracks)
 05 - Money Mane (Remix)
 06 - These Hands

Chevy Woods – Gang Land
 15 - M'Fer (featuring Wiz Khalifa)

Waka Flocka Flame - Triple F Life
 18 - Everything I Love (featuring Future & Trouble) (with Southside)

Jackie Chain – Bruce Lean Chronicles
 04 - Numbers

2 Chainz - Based on a T.R.U. Story
 05 - Birthday Song (featuring Kanye West) (with Kanye West (co.), BWheezy (co.), Anthony Kilhoffer (add.), Lifted (add.) and Mike Dean (add.))

DJ Khaled - Kiss the Ring
 13 - Don't Get Me Started (featuring Ace Hood)

Ace Hood - Body Bag 2
 07 - Don't Get Me Started
 10 - Lottery (featuring Kevin Cossom)

Trae Tha Truth - Tha Blackprint
 03 - Choppa Talk (featuring Young Jeezy & Yo Gotti)

Diamond – The Young Life
 03 - Reality Check
 09 - The Thirst

Rocko – Wordplay
 01 - Re (with Hollywood J)

Roscoe Dash - Roscoe 2.0
 10 - No Days Off

Reese – Reese Vs. The World 2
 06 - Again (featuring Curtis Williams)

B.o.B - Fuck 'Em We Ball
 13 - Greedy Love

Young Lace - Bipolar
 03 - Papered Up
 06 - Pick it Up

Future - Pluto 3D
 03 - First Class Flights
 07 - My
 08 - Same Damn Time (Remix) (featuring Diddy & Ludacris)

Frank Whyte - 1728
 03 - I'm Smashin' (featuring MopTop)

2013 
Sonny Digital & Que - Forbes Atlanta
 01 - Forbes Atlanta Intro
 02 - Young Nigga
 03 - DJ Ray G Speaks
 17 - Never Goin Broke

Beyoncé - TBA
 00 - Bow Down/I Been On

Chief Keef - Bang Pt. 2
 00 - Where He Get It (with 808 Mafia & Metro Boomin)

Ace Hood - Trials & Tribulations
 04 - Before The Rollie (featuring Meek Mill)
 10 - Pray For Me (with 808 Mafia & Metro Boomin)

2014 
Young Money - Young Money: Rise of an Empire
 03 - "Bang" (featuring Lil Twist, Euro, and Cory Gunz)

Wiz Khalifa - 28 Grams
 12 - "Jim Brown"
 17 - "Banger" (featuring Ty Dolla $ign)
 24 - "OUY"

Wiz Khalifa - Blacc Hollywood
 17 - "Word On the Town" (produced with Juicy J)

B.o.B - No Genre Pt. 2
 07 - "Get Right" (featuring Mike Fresh)

ILoveMakonnen – ILoveMakonnen
 03 - "Tuesday" (featuring Drake) (produced with Metro Boomin)
 02 - "I Don't Sell Molly No More (Featuring Wiz Khalifa)

2015 

Kourtney Money - The Return Of Money (Zone 6 Edition)
 "Tell 'Em Again" (ft. Young Nudy)

Future - DS2
 "Groupies" (produced with Metro Boomin & Southside)
 "Blow a Bag" (produced with Metro Boomin & Southside)

Travis Scott - Rodeo
 "Pornography" (produced with Metro Boomin)
 "Ok/Alright" ft. Schoolboy Q" (produced with Metro Boomin & Mike Dean)
 "Never Catch Me" (produced with Allen Ritter & WondaGurl)

Juicy J - 100% Juice
 03 - ''Beans And Lean''
 04 - ''Shut Da Fuc Up''
 06 - ''You Knew''
 07 - ''Scrape'' (ft. Wiz Khalifa & Project Pat)
 15 - "Touch Da Sky First" (produced with Metro Boomin, Southside, Lex Luger, and Crazy Mike)

Chief Keef - Finally Rollin 2
 03. "Black Ops"
 17. "Jumanji" (produced with Metro Boomin)

Chief Keef - Back From The Dead 3/Cabinet Fever
 00. Beethoven (produced with TM88 and Zaytoven)
 00. Drag Racin
 00. BIH
 00. Tweaker
 00. Stand
 00. Straight to the Bank

Wiz Khalifa - Cabin Fever 3
 "Prequel" ft. Curren$y
 "No Worries" ft. Chevy Woods
 "Finish Line" ft Project Pat
 "Left" ft. Yo Gotti
 "Move On" ft. Kevin Gates
 "Gangster 101" ft. King Los

50 Cent - The Kanan Tape
 I'm The Man"

Juicy J - OS To Oscar
 "Intro"
 "Durdy" (produced with Metro Boomin & Southside)
 "Curve Dat"

Migos & Rich The Kid - Streets on Lock 4
 "Richer Than Rappers"

Young Buck - 10 Pints
 "Ok"

YFN Lucci - Wish Me Well
 "So What" (ft. Johnny Cinco)

Pnb Rock - RNB 3 : Philadelphia
 "Alone"
 "Aftermath"
 "Fall N Luv"
 "Band$ on You"

Young Thug - Slime Season
 "Quarterback" (ft. Migos & Peewee Longway)

Jeezy - Gangsta Party
 "Pot Life"

Que - I Am Que
 "Gucci Said"

Lil Uzi Vert - Luv is Rage
 "Right Now"

Ty Dolla Sign - Airplane Mode
 "Do Thangs" (produced with Ty Dolla Sign)

Que - Lost Dawg
 "Back"

Key! - Screaming Dreams : The Prelude
 "50 Round Drums" ft. 21 Savage (produced with Metro Boomin and TM88)
 "Raise Hell" (produced with Zaytoven)
 "Hell Yeah"

21 Savage - Free Guwop
 "12AM"
 "Twenty1"
 "H2O" (produced with Zaytoven)
 "1 Foot"
 "Red Opps"
 "Supply" (produced with Metro Boomin & Southside)

21 Savage - Slaughter King
 "Wow"

SD - Just The Beginning
 "Fascinated"

Ace Hood - Starvation 4
 "954"

Key!
 "Store Run"

Zuse - Trap Zuse
 "Percy Miller"

OJ Juiceman - 6 Rings 3
 "Space Jam"

Lil Uzi Vert - The Wraith, The Uzi Vert
 "So Hit"

Jeezy - CITS
 "No Other Way"

2016 

Landstrip Chip - Cruising Control
 02. "On My Cross"
 08. "Bells" (feat. Droffe)

G.O.A.T
 "Don't Play" (feat. Young Sizzle and Juicy J)

Meek Mill - DC4
 05. "Froze" (featuring Lil Uzi Vert and Nicki Minaj)
 06. "The Difference" (featuring Quavo)

2017 
Machine Gun Kelly - Bloom
 07. "Trap Paris" (featuring Quavo & Ty Dolla $ign)
Smokepurpp
 "Nobody" (featuring Lil Peep) (produced with Metro Boomin & Southside)

2018 
Big Cat & PFTCommenter
 "Drink Paint" (featuring Tyler I am)

Travis Scott - Astroworld
 01. "Stargazing" (produced with B Wheezy, Bkorn & 30 Roc)

2019 

Big Cat & PFTCommenter

 "Chonk (It's Chonk)" (featuring Tyler I am)

2020 
Don Toliver - Heaven or Hell
 03. Cardigan (produced with Frank Dukes, Cvre, Mido, & Mike Dean
 04. After Party (produced with Mike Dean, Travis Scott, Cubeatz, & Nils)
 10. Spaceship (featuring Sheck Wes) (produced with Frank Dukes & Mike Dean)

Pap Chanel & Future
 "Gucci Bucket Hat" (produced with Rio Leyva & Project X)

2021 

Don Toliver - Life of a Don

 03. Way Bigger (produced with Bryvn, FrankieXY, & Sir Dylan)

Notes

References

External links 
 

1991 births
Living people
1017 Brick Squad artists
African-American businesspeople
African-American male rappers
African-American record producers
American people of Igbo descent
American hip hop record producers
American music publishers (people)
Businesspeople from Atlanta
Rappers from Atlanta
Songwriters from Georgia (U.S. state)
Southern hip hop musicians
Trap musicians
Universal Records artists
American hip hop DJs
21st-century American rappers
21st-century American male musicians
African-American songwriters
21st-century African-American musicians
American male songwriters
FL Studio users